Cuddlefish may refer to:

 Cuddlefish, an Australian music group with Candle Records
 Cuddlefish, a fictional American rock band mentioned in the iCarly television series
 Cuddlefish, a fictional animal in the video game Subnautica.